Elhadj Abdourahamane Bah (born 22 August 2001) is a Guinean professional footballer who plays as a midfielder and forward for Championnat National 2 club Châteaubriant, on loan from TFF First League club Samsunspor, and the Guinea national team.

Club career 
Best player and top scorer of the Guinée Championnat National in the previous season, Bah signed for Turkish club Samsunspor on a five-year contract on 6 September 2021. In 2022, he was loaned out to French club Châteaubriant for the season.

International career 
On 28 March 2021, Bah made his debut for the Guinea national team in a 2–1 loss to Namibia in Africa Cup of Nations qualification.

Honours 
Individual

 Guinée Championnat National best player: 
 Guinée Championnat National top goalscorer: 2020–21

References

External links 
 

2001 births
Living people
People from Boké
Guinean footballers
Association football midfielders
Association football forwards
CI Kamsar players
Samsunspor footballers
Voltigeurs de Châteaubriant players
Guinée Championnat National players
TFF First League players
Championnat National 2 players
Guinea youth international footballers
Guinea international footballers
Guinean expatriate footballers
Expatriate footballers in Turkey
Guinean expatriate sportspeople in Turkey
Expatriate footballers in France
Guinean expatriate sportspeople in France